Emily Anne Hughes (born January 26, 1989) is an American former figure skater. She is the 2007 Four Continents silver medalist and 2007 U.S. national silver medalist. She competed at the 2006 Winter Olympics, finishing 7th.

Personal life
Hughes was born in Great Neck, New York. Her father, John Hughes, was a Canadian of Irish descent, and was the captain of the NCAA champion 1969–70 Cornell University ice hockey team. Her mother, Amy Pastarnack, is Jewish and is a breast cancer survivor. Hughes has supported a variety of causes for breast cancer research and awareness, including Skating for Life, a television special that she promoted on NBC's Today show. She has five siblings. Her older sister, Sarah, is the 2002 Olympic figure skating champion, and her older brother, Matt, became an NYPD officer.

In 2002, Hughes cowrote a book in Random House's Young Dreamers series, I Am a Skater. On December 18, 2005, she was the subject of a cover story in the Sunday New York Times Magazine. She graduated from Great Neck North High School in June 2007, and announced on April 26, 2007 that she would attend Harvard University starting in fall 2007. Hughes had a concentration in sociology with a minor in government, and graduated as a member of the class of 2011.

In 2010, Hughes served as a legislative intern with the United States Senate. Starting in February 2012, she began employment with Deloitte Consulting in New York City as a business analyst. She left Deloitte in September 2013 and began working for the International Olympic Committee in Lausanne, Switzerland. She married Amit Mukherjee on September 2, 2017.

Skating career

Early years 
Hughes began learning to skate in 1993. In the 2001–2002 season, she qualified for her first U.S. Figure Skating Championships and placed 11th in the junior ladies' category. She repeated that placement the following season. She placed 5th on the junior level at the 2003–2004 Eastern Sectional Championships and so did not qualify for the 2004 U.S. Championships.

2004–2005 season 
Hughes moved up to the senior level nationally. She won her regional championship and placed second at Eastern Sectionals to qualify for the 2005 U.S. Figure Skating Championships. She placed 6th and was named to the team to the 2005 World Junior Championships. It was her first international competition and she won the bronze medal.

2005–2006 season 

In early August 2005, Hughes spent nearly a week in hospital due to viral meningitis. She debuted on the Grand Prix series, placing fifth at both of her assignments.
Hughes won the bronze medal at the 2006 U.S. Championships and was named as first alternate for a spot in the U.S. Olympic team. After Michelle Kwan's withdrawal, Hughes was added to the U.S. team at the 2006 Winter Olympics. She flew to Torino and placed 7th. She then competed at the 2006 World Championships, placing 8th.

2006–2007 season 
Hughes won her first Grand Prix medal, taking bronze at the 2006 Cup of China. She won silver at the 2007 U.S. Championships and then took silver at the 2007 Four Continents Championships. She placed 9th at the 2007 World Championships.

2007–2008 season 
Hughes switched from long-time coach Bonni Retzkin to Mark Mitchell and Peter Johansson at the Skating Club of Boston. She placed fourth at both of her Grand Prix events. On January 15, 2008, it was announced that Hughes would not compete in the 2008 U.S. Championships due to a hip injury that prevented her from training and competing.

2008–2009 season 
Hughes began her season at the North Atlantic Regional Championships, where she took the bronze medal. She qualified for the Eastern Sectionals but received a bye to the 2009 U.S. Championships due to her Grand Prix assignment. Hughes placed 9th at the 2008 Trophée Eric Bompard Grand Prix event.

On January 19, 2009, Hughes announced her withdrawal from the 2009 U.S. Figure Skating Championships due to an ankle injury.

2009–2010 season 
Later that year, Hughes took a semester off from Harvard in an attempt to qualify for the 2010 Winter Olympics. She specifically noted she wanted to qualify for the 2010 games so she could experience the opening ceremony, something she missed in 2006 since she was a late replacement to the team. In January 2010, she placed 9th at the 2010 U.S. Championships, which meant that she did not receive one of the two available Olympic spots.

Programs

Competitive highlights

See also
List of select Jewish figure skaters

References

External links 

 
 Twitter
 

American female single skaters
American people of Canadian descent
Figure skaters at the 2006 Winter Olympics
Harvard University alumni
American people of Irish descent
Jewish American sportspeople
Jewish American writers
Olympic figure skaters of the United States
People from Great Neck, New York
1989 births
Living people
Deloitte people
Four Continents Figure Skating Championships medalists
World Junior Figure Skating Championships medalists
Great Neck North High School alumni
21st-century American Jews
21st-century American women